This is a list of National Rugby League stadiums by capacity.

Current NRL stadiums  

This list includes all regular home grounds of National Rugby League clubs. Some of these venues have also hosted the Australian or New Zealand national rugby league teams.

Occasional stadiums

These venues are not the permanent home venues of NRL clubs, but intermittently host club NRL matches.

Proposed redevelopments and new NRL stadiums
Following is a list of current proposals for redevelopment or replacement of current NRL stadiums.

Former NRL stadiums
These venues have irregularly or previously hosted National Rugby League rugby league matches.

 Capacity shown is as it was during the time in use
† Club no longer exists in NRL
‡ Venue no longer exists
≠ ''Venue has since undergone renovation or complete re-build

See also

List of Australian Football League grounds
List of Australian cricket grounds
List of ice rinks in Australia
List of indoor arenas in Australia
List of National Basketball League (Australia) venues
List of Australian rugby union stadiums
List of soccer stadiums in Australia
List of Oceanian stadiums by capacity

References

External links
AUStadiums
List of venues

 
Rugby league
Stadiums
 
Rugby league